Jan Theodorus Wagenaar (born July 7, 1965 in Amersfoort) is a retired water polo player from the Netherlands. He finished in ninth position with the Dutch team at the 1992 Summer Olympics in Barcelona.

References
 Dutch Olympic Committee

External links
 

1965 births
Living people
Dutch male water polo players
Olympic water polo players of the Netherlands
Water polo players at the 1992 Summer Olympics
Sportspeople from Amersfoort
20th-century Dutch people